This article details the qualifying phase for tennis at the 2024 Summer Olympics.  The qualification pathway will be determined primarily based on the rankings maintained by the Association of Tennis Professionals (ATP) and the Women's Tennis Association (WTA).

Qualifying criteria
The main qualifying criterion will be the players' positions on the ATP and WTA ranking lists published on 10 June 2024. The players entering are formally submitted by the International Tennis Federation. The ATP and WTA rankings will be determined based on the performances achieved in the previous 52 weeks of the qualifying window. To be eligible, the players must satisfy the key criteria as part of the nominated team in two Billie Jean King Cup (women) or Davis Cup (men) events between Tokyo 2020 and Paris 2024 either if their nation competes at the Zone Group round robin level for the third year of the quadrennial cycle or if the player has represented their nation at least twenty times.

Each National Olympic Committee (NOC) can enter a maximum of twelve tennis players (six per gender) with a maximum of four entries each in the men's and women's singles (the best ranked within their respective country), two pairs each in the men's and women's doubles and a single pair in the mixed doubles.

For the singles, the top 56 players in the world rankings on 10 June 2024 of the WTA and ATP tours will qualify for the Olympics, respecting the four-player limit per NOC and gender. Hence, those ranked outside the top 56 and from NOCs with less than four entries are permitted to compete. A player could only participate if he or she is allowed and drafted to represent the player's country in Davis Cup or Billie Jean King Cup for three of the following years: 2022, 2023, and 2024. Six of the remaining eight slots are attributed to the NOCs with no other qualified tennis players across five continental zones (the winner and runner-up from the 2023 Pan American Games; the gold medalist each from the 2022 Asian Games and 2023 African Games; and the highest-ranked eligible player from Europe and Oceania whose NOC lacks a single qualified entrant). The final two spots are reserved, one for the host nation France and the other for the previous Olympic gold medalist or Grand Slam champion.

For the men's and women's doubles, thirty-two places will offer for the highest-ranked teams with ten of them reserved for players in the top ten of the doubles rankings, who could select his or her partner from their NOC ranked in the top 300 of either singles or doubles. The remaining spots are attributed to the pairs with the highest combined ranking until the 32-team field is complete. If the total quota of 86 players in the relevant gender remains incomplete, additional places continue to be allotted through the combined ranking. Once the field completes, the remaining pairs with both players qualified in the singles are officially selected based on their highest combined ranking; otherwise, additional places are assigned to the pairs with one player qualified in singles, followed by the remaining pairs without any qualified player in the singles tournament, if necessary. One team per gender is reserved for the host nation France if none has already become eligible otherwise.

With no quota places available for the mixed doubles, all teams will consist of players already entered in either the singles or doubles, including the top 15 combined ranking teams and the host nation France.

Qualified players

Men's singles

Women's singles

Men's doubles

Women's doubles

Mixed doubles

Notes

References

Qualification for the 2024 Summer Olympics
Tennis at the 2024 Summer Olympics
Qualification for tennis tournaments